SM UC-2 was a German Type UC I minelayer submarine or U-boat in the German Imperial Navy during World War I. The U-boat had been ordered by November 1914 and was launched on 12 May 1915. She was commissioned into the German Imperial Navy on 17 May 1915 as SM UC-2. Mines laid by UC-2 in her two patrols were not credited with sinking any ships.

Design
A German Type UC I submarine, UC-2 had a displacement of  when at the surface and  while submerged. The submarine was powered by one Daimler-Motoren-Gesellschaft six-cylinder, four-stroke diesel engine producing , an electric motor producing , and one propeller shaft.

UC-2 was fitted with six  mine tubes, twelve UC 120 mines, and one  machine gun. She was built by AG Vulcan Stettin and her complement was fourteen crew members.

Fate
UC-2 sailed from Zeebrugge on 29 June 1915 to lay mines off Lowestoft. On 2 July she was accidentally run down by the coaster Cottingham off that same port; the impact tore a  opening in the forward part of the pressure hull, and the submarine sank. The Cottingham'''s master reported the incident and the area was subsequently dragged by Royal Navy vessels, whose lines fouled an underwater obstruction and caused a substantial submerged explosion.

References

Notes

Citations

Bibliography

 
 

German Type UC I submarines
U-boats commissioned in 1915
World War I submarines of Germany
Maritime incidents in 1915
U-boats sunk in 1915
U-boats sunk by mines
1915 ships
World War I minelayers of Germany
Ships built in Hamburg
World War I shipwrecks in the North Sea
Ships lost with all hands